The Bithyni were a Thracian tribe who, along with the Thyni, migrated to Anatolia. Herodotus, Xenophon and Strabo all assert that the Bithyni and Thyni settled together in what would be known as Bithynia and Thynia. According to Herodotus, the Bithynian Thracians originally lived along the Strymon river, and were known as Strymonians.

Ancient tribes in Thrace
Bithynia
Ancient peoples of Anatolia
Thracian tribes